Israel Wachser (1892 – 24 May 1919) was a Russian writer of Yiddish and Hebrew short stories and children's literature.

Biography

By the beginning of World War I, Wachser had begun working as a teacher in Kiev, and writing Hebrew and Yiddish poetry and prose. In 1916, he took a teaching position in a school for refugees in Baku, but was forced to flee the city amid the beginning of the Armenian–Azerbaijani War. He hastily destroyed most of his writings before leaving, although his older brother was able to save the remaining part of his work. Wachser spent some time in Odessa before settling in the Podolian town of Krivozer.

Along with several other young Jews, he was killed on 24 May 1919 while defending the local Jewish population from Ukrainian pogromists.

Work
Wachser published only one piece while alive, a Hebrew short story in Ha-mevaser ha-kavkazi (Baku, 1915). He left numerous works in manuscript: the plays On kinder ('Without Children'), Af mesires-nefesh ('Out of Devotion'), and Bay di ibergeblibene ('With the Survivors'), the stories Naftoli der soyfer ('Naftoli the Scribe'), A kindele ('A Small Child'), Der khoyv ('The Debt'), and Der nitsokhn (Victory), the poem "Dos indzele un di yam-tekhter" ('The Island and the Sea-Girl'), and a series of children tales.

After his death, four of his children's stories in Yiddish were published in one collection by Eliezer Steinberg. Further publications and translations of Wachser's work would follow.

Collections of manuscripts, correspondences, clippings, and photographs of Wachser are held at the Jewish Theological Seminary and YIVO Archives in New York City.

Partial bibliography

References

1892 births
1919 deaths
Russian children's writers
Ukrainian children's writers
Jewish martyrs
People from Lipovetsky Uyezd
Yiddish-language playwrights
Yiddish-language poets
Schoolteachers from the Russian Empire
Jewish educators
Jewish writers from the Russian Empire
Dramatists and playwrights from the Russian Empire
Short story writers from the Russian Empire
Poets from the Russian Empire